is a former Japanese football player.

Club statistics

References

External links

j-league

1982 births
Living people
Juntendo University alumni
Association football people from Hiroshima Prefecture
Japanese footballers
J2 League players
Japan Football League players
Sagawa Shiga FC players
Mito HollyHock players
Verspah Oita players
Association football midfielders
Universiade medalists in football
Universiade gold medalists for Japan